Johan Alberto Venegas Ulloa (born 27 November 1988) is a Costa Rican professional footballer who plays for Liga FPD club Alajuelense and the Costa Rica national team.

Club career
Venegas started his career at Santos de Guápiles and had a short loan spell at Barrio México in 2011. He joined Puntarenas in 2012,  and had a big season with the club scoring 12 goals in 37 appearances. This led to a move to top club Alajuelense in 2013. In his first year for Alajuelense Vanegas quickly established himself as a starter on the club making 34 appearances and scoring 4 goals. The following season, he continued his fine form and ended the season with a career high 13 goals in 38 matches.

In July 2015, Venegas joined Major League Soccer team Montreal Impact, after impressing the Canadian club during the 2014–15 CONCACAF Champions League. During his time with Montreal, Venegas appeared in 32 league matches and scored two goals. He also made seven appearances during the Playoffs, scoring one goal.

On 13 December 2016, Venegas was traded to Minnesota United FC in exchange for Chris Duvall.

After spending the 2017 season with Minnesota, the club announced that Venegas would be loaned to Costa Rican side Deportivo Saprissa for 2018. His contract with Minnesota ended following the 2018 season.

On 26 December 2020, Venegas was announced as Alajuelense's new signing.

International career
Venegas made his debut for the Costa Rica national team in the September 2014 Copa Centroamericana opening match against Nicaragua, in which he scored the third goal. He was again on target in his second game against Panama, netting Costa Rica's 100th goal in all Copa Centroamerica tournaments in the process.

In May 2018 he was named in Costa Rica's 23-man squad for the 2018 FIFA World Cup in Russia.

Career statistics

Scores and results list Costa Rica's goal tally first, score column indicates score after each Venegas goal.

Honours
Alajuelense
 Liga FPD: Apertura 2013

Saprissa
 Liga FPD: Clausura 2018, Clausura 2020
 CONCACAF League: 2019

Costa Rica
 Copa Centroamericana: 2014

Individual
 CONCACAF League Golden Ball: 2019
 CONCACAF League Golden Boot: 2019, 2020

References

External links

Player profile – Alajuelense

1988 births
Living people
People from Limón Province
Association football wingers
Costa Rican footballers
Puntarenas F.C. players
L.D. Alajuelense footballers
CF Montréal players
Deportivo Saprissa players
Costa Rican expatriate footballers
Costa Rica international footballers
2014 Copa Centroamericana players
2015 CONCACAF Gold Cup players
Copa América Centenario players
2017 Copa Centroamericana players
2017 CONCACAF Gold Cup players
2018 FIFA World Cup players
2021 CONCACAF Gold Cup players
2022 FIFA World Cup players
Copa Centroamericana-winning players
Santos de Guápiles footballers
Liga FPD players
Major League Soccer players
Expatriate soccer players in Canada
Expatriate soccer players in the United States
Costa Rican expatriate sportspeople in the United States
Costa Rican expatriate sportspeople in Canada